Beskid may refer to one of the following:

 Beskids, mountain ranges in Carpathian Mountains
 Beskid (car), a Polish economy car model
 Beskid Andrychów, a Polish football club
 Beskid (ski), tourist skis for mountain skiing, manufactured in Mukachevo

See also 
 Central Beskids (disambiguation)
 Eastern Beskids (disambiguation)
 Beskidian Foothills (disambiguation)